Mariela Analia Delgado (born 26 July 1986) is an Argentine Paralympic cyclist who competes in international elite cycling events and races for the able-bodied road cycling team Weber La Segunda Ladies Power. She is a triple Parapan American Games champion, six-time World medalist and has competed at the 2016 and 2020 Summer Paralympics.

Delgado was the first Argentine to compete at both the Pan American Games and Parapan American Games. She competed at the 2015 Pan American Games in the road race and road time trial where she was placed 22nd and 13th respectively.

References

1986 births
Living people
Cyclists from Buenos Aires
Paralympic cyclists of Argentina
Argentine female cyclists
Cyclists at the 2016 Summer Paralympics
Cyclists at the 2020 Summer Paralympics
Medalists at the 2015 Parapan American Games
Medalists at the 2019 Parapan American Games
Cyclists at the 2015 Pan American Games
21st-century Argentine women